Koepcke or Köpcke is a surname. Notable people with the name include:

 Juliane Koepcke (born 1954), German mammalogist
 Karl-Heinz Köpcke (1922–1991) German television presenter
 Maria Koepcke (1924–1971), German ornithologist 
 Hans-Wilhelm Koepcke (1914–2000), German ornithologist  and herpetologist
Wolfgang Köpcke (born 1948), German athlete

de:Köpcke
German-language surnames